Mohammed Ibrahim Al Shaibani (Arabic: محمد إبراهيم الشيباني), also known as HE Excellency Mohammed Al Shaibani (or Al Shaibani, b. 1964,) is a non-royal government official in Dubai, UAE, currently serving as director general of The Ruler's Court, Government of Dubai (also known as Al Diwan Al Amiri, or Diwan Al Hakim), a prime government body of the Emirate of Dubai.

He is the board member & managing director of the Investment Corporation of Dubai and also serves as the vice chairman of the Supreme Fiscal Committee of Dubai. He is a member of the Executive Council of Dubai, an entity that oversees and supports government bodies in the emirate.

He is chairman of Dubai Islamic Bank (DIB) and sits on the boards of several state owned UAE enterprises, such as Dubai World and Dubai Aerospace Enterprise (DAE).

Career

Early life
According to a profile in Arab News, he has a Bachelor of Computer Science from a university in the United States. He started his career at Dubai Ports Authority and Jebel Ali Free Zone, where he worked for seven years. After that, he moved to Singapore where he spent four years as managing director of Al Khaleej Investments.

Government roles
Since 1998 Al Shaibani has held president's position with the Dubai Office, a private management entity for the Royal Family of Dubai. In this capacity, he represented the interests of the ruling family in London for eight years from 1999 to 2007. He currently oversees the functioning of this office from Dubai.

Mohammed Al Shaibani is also a member of the Executive Council, Government of Dubai, which was created in 2003 to support government authorities in maintaining the stability and organization of the emirate, in addition to developing its society and economy. The Executive Council is responsible for setting and implementing the general strategy of Dubai, as well as enforcing local laws. The Council also sets the annual budget for the Government of Dubai.

Al Shaibani also serves as the vice chairman of the Supreme Fiscal Committee (SFC) of Dubai since its inception in 2007. This five-man committee supervises the Dubai Financial Support Fund. In 2008, Al Shaibani was appointed director general of The Ruler's Court, Government of Dubai, by Emiri decree issued by Sheikh Mohammed bin Rashid Al Maktoum, ruler of Dubai.

Business involvement
In 2008, Al Shaibani was appointed as chairman of the Board of Directors of Dubai Islamic Bank (DIB), an Islamic bank based in Dubai. DIB is also considered as the first bank in the world to apply Islamic principles in all its practices. 

An Emiri decree issued in 2012 by Sheikh Mohammed bin Rashid Al Maktoum, ruler of Dubai, reaffirmed Al Shaibani as CEO and executive director of the Investment Corporation of Dubai (ICD), the investment arm that consolidates the assets of the Government of Dubai.

In 2010, Al Shaibani has been appointed as a member of the Board of Directors of Dubai World, the government-owned holding focused on urban development.

In 2013, he served as the deputy chairman of the Higher Preparatory Committee of the World Expo 2020.

After acquiring the entertainment resort Atlantis the Palm in 2013, ICD has purchased significant equity interest in the international firm that manages it, Kerzner International. This was followed by Mohammed Al Shaibani replacing Sol Kerzner as the chairman of the international luxury hotels developer after the latter's retirement in April 2014.

In January 2020, he was appointed chairman of Nakheel, a property developer in Dubai that has recently been named as a member of the higher committee of real estate announced by Sheikh Mohammed Bin Rashid, Vice President and Ruler of Dubai.

Awards and recognition 
He was ranked the most influential non-royal official in UAE by the Wall Street Journal in 2010 and one of the country's ten most influential people by Your Middle East platform in 2013. That year, Mohammed Al Shaibani was also considered as the sixth of the 500 most powerful Arabs in the world by Arabian Business, and he was named the 17th of the 100 most powerful Arabs in 2014 by Gulf Business. In 2020, he was ranked at 26 on Construction Week's Power 100 list for 2020. He was featured in Cityscape Intelligence's most influential people in the MENA real estate industry.

References

1964 births
Living people
Emirati businesspeople
Emirati Sunni Muslims
Emirati bankers
People from Dubai